In this article, the busiest airports in Indonesia are measured according to data presented by the Airport Council International organization and the Angkasa Pura companies.

Passenger traffic 

 Medan Airport (MES) closed in 2013, switches to Kualanamu (KNO)                                                            
 Kemayoran Airport (JKT) closed in 1985, switches to Soekarno-Hatta (CGK)
 Temindung Airport (SRI) closed in 2018, switch to APT Pranoto (AAP)

References

Indonesia
Airports
Airports, busiest
Airports, busiest